WCNZ (1660 AM) is a radio station broadcasting a Catholic talk format as an affiliate of Relevant Radio. Licensed to Marco Island, Florida, United States, it serves the Naples area. The station is owned by Relevant Radio, Inc.

History
WCNZ originated as the expanded band "twin" of an existing station on the standard AM band. On March 17, 1997 the Federal Communications Commission (FCC) announced that eighty-eight stations had been given permission to move to newly available "Expanded Band" transmitting frequencies, ranging from 1610 to 1700 kHz, with WODX in Marco Island authorized to move from 1480 to 1660 kHz.

The FCC's initial policy was that both the original station and its expanded band counterpart could operate simultaneously for up to five years, after which owners would have to turn in one of the two licenses, depending on whether they preferred the new assignment or elected to remain on the original frequency. However, this deadline was extended multiple times, and both stations continued to be authorized until AM 1480, now WVOI, was deleted on June 3, 2021.

The new station on 1660 AM went on the air as WMIB on May 21, 1999.  On January 18, 2002, the station changed its call sign to WCNZ.

In February 2009 WCNZ and its simulcast sister, WMYR 1410 AM in Fort Myers, changed from Catholic programming to Scott Shannon's The True Oldies Channel. In the fall of that same year, WMYR/WCNZ changed to a "Timeless Cool" format branded as "The Avenue."

On April 1, 2013, WCNZ flipped its format to emphasize the call letters of the station it was simulcasting, WMYR, branding itself "Original Classic Country 1410". Its Web site mentioned it was "The First station to bring ELVIS to town, before he was a superstar. We are proud to bring back the great music of Waylon Jennings, Willie Nelson, Johnny Cash, Dolly Parton and Reba McEntire....along with new classic country artists like Alan Jackson, Toby Keith, Kenny Chesney and Tim McGraw."

The Florida Everblades ice hockey team signed a deal with The Avenue to carry the team's games for the 2010–2011 season.

On April 1, 2013 WCNZ and WMYR changed their format to classic country.

WCNZ switched to a religious format in April 2014.

In November 2016, the station was observed identifying as "Relevant Radio". The website of Ardiente Radio does not mention any AM frequency.

References

External links
Official website

CNZ
Radio stations established in 1998
Relevant Radio stations
1998 establishments in Florida